Bastian Doreth (born 8 June 1989) is a German basketball player for Medi Bayreuth of the Basketball Bundesliga. He is a former member of the German national basketball team.

Career
Born in the city of Nürnberg, Doreth played his first professional seasons with Falke Nürnberg and Nürnberger BC.

In 2010, Doreth signed with Bayern Munich but played one season on loan with TBB Trier.

Since 2015, Doreth plays with Medi Bayreuth. On 9 July 2020, he extended his contract until 2022.

References

External links
Eurobasket profile

1989 births
Living people
Artland Dragons players
FC Bayern Munich basketball players
German men's basketball players
Medi Bayreuth players
Nürnberg Falcons BC players
Point guards
Sportspeople from Nuremberg